Catenulispora pinisilvae is a bacterium from the genus of Catenulispora which has been isolated from soil from a pine forest near Torun in Poland.

References

Actinomycetia
Bacteria described in 2020